The Institute for Experimental Mathematics (IEM) was founded, with the support of the Volkswagen
Foundation, as a central scientific facility of the former University of Essen, now University of Duisburg-Essen in 1989.  With the addition of the Alfried Krupp von Bohlen und Halbach Foundation Chair on 1 January 1999, the Institute was expanded in the area of Computer Networking Technology. A.J. Han Vinck is currently the Institute's managing director.

The primary objective of the Institute is to foster interactions between the fields of mathematics, computer science and the engineering sciences. Mathematicians, computer experts and telecommunications engineers are engaged in trans-disciplinary collaboration under one roof. The main areas of research are discrete mathematics, number theory, digital communication, and computer networking technology.

Staff members
Prof. Dr. Massimo Bertolini
Prof. Dr. Dr. h.c. Gerhard Frey
Prof. Dr. Wolfgang Lempken
Prof. Dr.-Ing. Erwin P. Rathgeb
Prof. Dr. Trung van Tran
Prof. Dr. ir. Han Vinck
Prof. Dr. Helmut Völklein

External staff members
Prof. Dr. Gebhard Böckle, Universität Duisburg-Essen
Prof. Dr. Hélène Esnault, Universität Duisburg-Essen
Prof. Dr. Eckart Viehweg, Universität Duisburg-Essen
Prof. Dr. Dr. h.c. Kees Schouhamer Immink, Turing Machines, Netherlands
Prof. Dr. Gabor Wiese

External links
 IEM Home page

University of Duisburg-Essen
Mathematical institutes